Olga Generalova (born April 4, 1972) is a Russian triathlete. Born in Gorky (now Nizhny Novgorod), Generalova competed at the second Olympic triathlon at the 2004 Summer Olympics.  She took thirty-first place with a total time of 2:11:48.06.

References

External links
 Profile

1972 births
Living people
Russian female triathletes
Triathletes at the 2004 Summer Olympics
Olympic triathletes of Russia
Sportspeople from Nizhny Novgorod